An American Story is a novel published in 1986 by Canadian writer Jacques Godbout. Its English translation, by Yves Saint-Pierre, was published in 1988.

Plot summary
Grégory Francœur, a brilliant professor from Quebec, leaves his family and political career behind to become the assistant to a distinguished academic in San Francisco. Because of a misunderstanding, typical of the ambiguity that has been Francœur's lot in life, he becomes involved in a dangerous case of illegal immigration.

Impact
Une histoire américaine was one of the novels chosen for inclusion in the French version of Canada Reads, broadcast on Première Chaîne in 2004, where it was championed by trade unionist Gérald Larose.

References

1986 Canadian novels
Canadian French-language novels
Novels set in San Francisco